Anémone Marmottan (born 25 May 1988) is a French World Cup alpine ski racer and soldier.

Born in Bourg-Saint-Maurice, Savoie, Marmottan won a gold medal in the team event at the 2011 World Championships, and the next day finished 14th in the giant slalom.

Career
Marmottan began skiing at age two with her family in her hometown of Savine, and joined the local ski club in her area, where she got her first taste for competing.
In March 2011, she fractured her tibia and fibula while racing in  a Europa Cup event in Zakopane, Poland. The injury resulted in surgery, six months in a cast, and another six months wearing a support brace.

At the 2014 Winter Olympics in Sochi, Marmottan finished 8th in the giant slalom and 13th in the slalom at Rosa Khutor. She attained her first World Cup podium in March 2014 at Åre, Sweden, runner-up in a giant slalom to Anna Fenninger.

World Cup results

Season standings

Race podiums
 
1 podiums – (1 GS), 13 top tens (13 (GS)

Olympic results

References

External links

 
 Anémone Marmottan World Cup standings at the International Ski Federation
 
 
 French Ski Team – 2014 women's A team – 
 Rossignol.com – Anémone Marmottan – alpine skiing – France
  – 

1988 births
Living people
French female alpine skiers
Olympic alpine skiers of France
Alpine skiers at the 2010 Winter Olympics
People from Bourg-Saint-Maurice
Alpine skiers at the 2014 Winter Olympics
Sportspeople from Savoie